The R508 is a Regional Route in South Africa that connects Musina with Tshipise.

Route
It begins in Musina, Limpopo and runs south-south-east to for 36 kilometres the village of Tshipise where it ends at a junction with the R525.

References

Regional Routes in Limpopo